Dr. Sharanaparakash Rudrappa Patil (Kannada: ಡಾ. ಶರಣ ಪ್ರಕಾಶ್ ಪಾಟೀಲ್, also known as Sharan Prakash Patil) was Minister for Medical Education in the Government of Karnataka.

Career
Dr. Patil was a 3 time MLA, representing the Sedam constituency in Gulbarga District. He is a doctor by profession and holds a master's degree in dermatology.

References

State cabinet ministers of Karnataka
Living people
Year of birth missing (living people)
Karnataka MLAs 2004–2007
Karnataka MLAs 2008–2013
Karnataka MLAs 2013–2018